8 Simple Rules for Dating My Teenage Daughter is an American television sitcom that originally aired on ABC from September 17, 2002 to April 15, 2005. Loosely based on humor columnist W. Bruce Cameron's book of the same name, the show starred John Ritter during its first season. After Ritter's sudden death, Katey Sagal took over the show's starring position for the rest of the series' run. Overall, 76 episodes were made over three seasons.

Series overview

Episodes

Season 1 (2002–03)

Season 2 (2003–04)

Season 3 (2004–05)

References

External links 
 
 

Lists of American sitcom episodes
8 Simple Rules